Orientation is Sonata Arctica's second EP, released on 22 August 2001 through the label Spinefarm Records.

Track list

Personnel
Tony Kakko – Vocals
Jani Liimatainen – Guitar
Marko Paasikoski – Bass guitar
Mikko Härkin – Keyboards
Tommy Portimo – Drums

Mixed by Mikko Karmila at Finnvox Studios and mastered by Mika Jussila at Finnvox Studios.

References

2001 EPs
Sonata Arctica albums
Spinefarm Records EPs